Hilda is a feminine given name. It may also refer to:

Places
 Hilda, Kentucky, an unincorporated community in Rowan County, Kentucky
 Hilda, Taney County, Missouri, an unincorporated community
 Hilda, South Carolina, a town
 Hilda, Texas, an unincorporated community
 Hilda, Alberta, Canada, a hamlet
 153 Hilda, a large asteroid
 Hilda group, a group of asteroids

Other uses
 Tropical Storm Hilda (disambiguation), various storms in the Atlantic, Pacific and Indian Oceans
 SS Hilda, a steamship
 Household, Income and Labour Dynamics in Australia Survey, a panel dataset
 Hilda, name used by the South African Defence Force for the Tiger Cat variant of the Sea Cat missile system
 Hilda (graphic novel series), a British children's graphic novel series by Luke Pearson
 Hilda (TV series), a British-American-Canadian animated television series based on the graphic novel series of the same name